Ludwig Derangadage Scotty (born 20 June 1948) is a Nauruan politician who twice served as President of Nauru and was Speaker of Parliament five times between 2000 and 2016. He served as president from 29 May 2003 to 8 August 2003 and again from 22 July 2004 until his ousting in a vote of no confidence on 19 December 2007. He was elected as president in 2003, again from November 2010 to April 2013, and from June 2013 to June 2016.

Background and earlier career

Scotty grew up in Anabar in the north of Nauru; he attended secondary school from 1960 until 1964 and studied law at the University of the South Pacific in the Fijian capital city Suva. On 15 March 1983 he was first elected to the Parliament for his district Anbar; in his longtime tenure as parliament member Scotty was the chairman of the Bank of Nauru, the Nauru Rehabilitation Corporation and in the board of directors of Air Nauru.

He served as Speaker of Parliament from April 2000 to March 2001, May 2001 to December 2002, February 2004 to April 2004, November 2010 to April 2013, and June 2013 to July 2016, while representing the Anabar district.
He was appointed as Minister Assisting the President of Nauru in the cabinet of Derog Gioura from March 2003 to May 2003.

President of Nauru 2003

At the end of the short administration of Derog Gioura, Ludwig Scotty was elected President of Nauru by a parliamentary vote of 10–7, defeating Centre Party leader and former President Kinza Clodumar.

President Scotty's cabinet included himself as Minister of Foreign Affairs, Baron D. Waqa of Boe as Minister of Education, David Adeang of Ubenide as Minister of Finance, Dr. Kieren Keke of Yaren as Minister of Health, Russel E. Kun of Ubenide as Minister of Justice and Dogabe A. Jeremiah of Meneng as Minister of Public Works.

Ludwig Scotty was ousted in a vote of no confidence in August 2003 and was replaced as president by René Harris.

Period in Opposition 2003–2004

Scotty spent a short period in Opposition from August 2003 until July 2004, remaining a member of the Parliament of Nauru.

President of Nauru 2004–2007

Ludwig Scotty returned as president on 22 July 2004 after a member of Harris's faction of the Parliament of Nauru defected. Ludwig was re-elected to Parliament in elections in October 2004, and most of his allies also did well. In this term, Scotty became the first president of Nauru to give up the foreign affairs ministry, as David Adeang was appointed to that position.

Scotty's government implemented major reforms to restore the country's economy.

Scotty and his supporters won a landslide victory in the parliamentary election held on 25 August 2007. On 28 August, Scotty was re-elected as president with the support of 14 of the 18 members of parliament, defeating Marcus Stephen.

Despite the grave problems which the Nauruan authorities faced in the early 21st Century, the years under the Presidency of Ludwig Scotty saw some measure of stability return to the island Republic, albeit constrained by austerity measures. The liberal use of Parliamentary no-confidence motions, the occasion of many crises of government over several years, seemed initially to have subsided under Ludwig Scotty's widely respected tenure of office. A constitutional review was being proceeded with, with a view to improving the functioning of Parliament and the offices of state.

On 13 November 2007, a motion of no-confidence against Scotty's government was unsuccessful; although a majority of those voting supported the motion (eight in favor, seven opposed), it fell short of the necessary nine votes. The motion was led by Dr. Kieren Keke, and it was based on allegations of misconduct on the part of Adeang and Scotty's unwillingness to act against Adeang.

On 19 December 2007, however, a newly comprised majority in Parliament did succeed in ousting President Scotty through a new vote of no confidence (ten votes in favour, seven opposed). The motion was based on the same causes as the November vote. Marcus Stephen was sworn in as President of Nauru.

Post-Presidency and legacy

Ludwig Scotty remained a member of the Parliament of Nauru, following the no confidence defeat in Parliament of his Administration in 2007. Coming as it did only a few months after the landslide victory of his supporters at the polls in August 2007, his relinquishing of office so soon afterwards can be seen in terms of an element of promise and expectations unfilled.

It remained to be seen whether Scotty, who turned 60 in 2008, and whose Administration was replaced by a ministerial team several of whom were many years his junior, would in the future seek a further term of office as president. His second Administration of 2004 - 2007, however, is increasingly regarded by some observers as one which was characterized by relative stability for the Republic of Nauru in contrast with the political upheavals and crises which occurred before and after this Administration. It also arguably represented a period when the Nauru electorate and their representatives were appearing to come to terms with being educated into the perceived need for economic austerity measures and the disciplines which coincided with them, and into a broader reflection on improvements in political culture. In the earlier part of 2008, somewhat of an oblique compliment was being paid to constitutional review process identified with Scotty when both Government and Opposition were claiming it as part of their legacy.

In April 2008 Scotty stood again for the Parliament of Nauru and was reelected to serve as a Member.

In March 2010 former President Scotty intervened the constitutional reform debate. Mr Scotty doubted whether changes proposed by the current Government of Nauru commanded popular support.

Speaker of Parliament
Scotty served his first two terms as speaker from April 2000 to March 2001, and May 2001 to December 2002, after which he was elected as president.

In November 2010, Scotty was elected Speaker of the House again, breaking a 6-month deadlock which had paralysed the government. His election as Speaker enabled MPs to elect a President, and Marcus Stephen was duly re-elected President of Nauru. Scotty explained that he remained a member of the Opposition to Stephen's government (though he would of course carry out his duties in an impartial manner), but that he had accepted the position of Speaker so that Parliament could function (giving the Opposition a say in government), and so that a budget could be adopted. He explained that his decision was also due to the allegations over Opposition members receiving financial support from Australian company Getax. Speaker Scotty resigned on 18 April 2013 amid increasing parliamentary deadlock and infighting, started over his own attempt to dissolve Parliament, he was temporarily succeeded by Deputy Speaker Landon Deireragea who served as acting speaker until 25 April when Godfrey Thoma was elected as Speaker after being nominated by former President Marcus Stephen.

Scotty was returned to the chair after the 2013 parliamentary election as the nominee of the government of Baron Waqa. Scotty was elected with 14 votes to 5 five for opposition nominee Kieren Keke. His deputy is newly elected MP Ranin Akua who was elected unopposed.

References
Specific

General
 https://web.archive.org/web/20130926022811/http://islandsbusiness.com/2013/5/pacific-update/nauru-elections-in-possible-delay/

Speakers of the Parliament of Nauru
Members of the Parliament of Nauru
1948 births
Living people
Presidents of Nauru
Finance Ministers of Nauru
People from Anabar District
University of the South Pacific alumni
Ministers Assisting the President of Nauru
21st-century Nauruan politicians